Patti's Songs was a Patti Page album, issued by Mercury Records as a 10" long-playing record, as catalog number MG-25197. Musical accompanment by Jack Rael's Orchestra.

Track listing

References

1954 albums
Patti Page albums
Mercury Records albums